Tatyana Kurochkina (née Matsuta, born 15 September 1967) is a Belarusian former 400m hurdler. She represented the Soviet Union at the 1988 Seoul Olympics, where she finished seventh in the final in a lifetime best of 54.39 secs. She went on to represent Belarus  at the 1996 Atlanta Olympics.

International competitions

References

1967 births
Living people
Sportspeople from Grodno
Soviet female hurdlers
Belarusian female hurdlers
Olympic athletes of the Soviet Union
Athletes (track and field) at the 1988 Summer Olympics
Olympic athletes of Belarus
Athletes (track and field) at the 1996 Summer Olympics
World Athletics Championships athletes for Belarus